David Moss may refer to:

 David Moss (basketball) (born 1983), American basketball player
 David Moss (footballer, born 1952), English footballer, played for Luton Town and Swindon Town
 David Moss (footballer, born 1968), English footballer, played for Falkirk and Dunfermline Athletic
 David Moss (ice hockey) (born 1981), American ice hockey player
 David Moss (musician) (born 1949), US-American vocalist-percussionist and composer
 David Moss (diplomat) (born 1938), British diplomat
 David A. Moss (born 1964), Harvard business professor
 Dave Moss (CHERUB), a fictional character in the book series CHERUB
 Lasercorn, born David Moss, a personality on the YouTube channel SmoshGames